Guilherme Valadão Gama (born 25 January 1991) is a Brazilian handballer for Romanian club Steaua București and the Brazilian national team.

He represented Brazil at the 2019 World Men's Handball Championship.

Titles
South and Central American Men's Club Handball Championship:
2019, 2021

References

1991 births
Living people
People from São Bernardo do Campo
Brazilian male handball players
Expatriate handball players
Brazilian expatriate sportspeople in Spain
Brazilian expatriate sportspeople in Romania
Liga ASOBAL players
BM Granollers players
CSA Steaua București (handball) players
South American Games medalists in handball
South American Games gold medalists for Brazil
Sportspeople from São Paulo (state)
21st-century Brazilian people